The 49th Arizona State Legislature, consisting of the Arizona State Senate and the Arizona House of Representatives, was constituted in Phoenix from January 1, 2009, to December 31, 2010, during the final month of Janet Napolitano's second term in office, prior to her resignation to become United States Secretary of Homeland Security, and the first two years of her successor, Jan Brewer. Both the Senate and the House membership remained constant at 30 and 60, respectively. The Republicans gained a seat in the Senate, increasing the majority to 18–12. The Republicans also gained two seats in the lower chamber, giving them a 35–25 majority.

Sessions
The Legislature met for two regular sessions at the State Capitol in Phoenix. The first opened on January 12, 2009, and adjourned on July 12, while the Second Regular Session convened on January 11, 2010, and adjourned sine die on April 29.

There were nine Special Sessions, the first of which was convened on January 28, 2009, and adjourned on January 31; the second convened on May 21, 2009, and adjourned sine die on May 27; the third convened on July 6, 2009, and adjourned sine die August 25; the fourth convened on November 17, 2009, and adjourned sine die on November 23; the fifth convened on December 17, 2009, and adjourned sine die December 19; the sixth special session convened on February 1, 2010, and adjourned sine die on February 11; the seventh special session convened on March 8, 2010, and convened sine die on March 16; the eighth special session convened on March 29, 2010, and adjourned sine die on April 1; and the ninth and final special convened on August 9, 2010, and adjourned sine die on August 11.

State Senate

Members

The asterisk (*) denotes members of the previous Legislature who continued in office as members of this Legislature.

House of Representatives

Members 
The asterisk (*) denotes members of the previous Legislature who continued in office as members of this Legislature.

References

Arizona legislative sessions
2009 in Arizona
2010 in Arizona
2009 U.S. legislative sessions
2010 U.S. legislative sessions